The Roman L. Hruska Federal Courthouse is a  Federal Courthouse located at 111 S. 18th Plz. in  Downtown Omaha, Nebraska. Completed in 2000, the six story courthouse serves the United States District Court for the District of Nebraska, and features nine courtrooms and a central atrium; built at a cost of $70 million. It was dedicated October 24, 2000, in front of an audience of over 400 people.  The courthouse is built on the former site of several historic buildings, including the Hotel Fontenelle, razed in 1983. and the Omaha Athletic Club, razed in 1992.   It was the first courthouse in the country to be built under the GSA’s Design Excellence Program.

See also
 List of United States federal courthouses

References

External links
 Official Nebraska Government Website: Nebraska Memories
 Abby Suckle: The Roman L. Hruska Federal Courthouse

Federal courthouses in the United States
Courthouses in Nebraska
Government buildings completed in 2000
2000 establishments in Nebraska
Buildings and structures in Omaha, Nebraska